Somapur is a village in Haveri district of Karnataka, India.

References

Villages in Belagavi district